Benjamin Redžić (born September 26, 2002), also known as Beni Redžić, is an American soccer player who plays as a winger.

Career

North Texas
Redžić made his league debut for the club on July 25, 2020, scoring the winning goal in a 2–1 home victory over Forward Madison.

FC Dallas
On April 9, 2021, Redžić signed a homegrown player contract with FC Dallas. In June, he suffered an ankle injury that required surgery, causing him to miss the remainder of the 2021 season.

Following the 2022 season, Redžić's contract option was declined by Dallas.

References

External links
Beni Redzic at US Soccer Development Academy

2002 births
Living people
North Texas SC players
USL League One players
American soccer players
Soccer players from Texas
Bosnia and Herzegovina youth international footballers
United States men's youth international soccer players
Association football forwards
People from Carrollton, Texas
FC Dallas players
Homegrown Players (MLS)
Major League Soccer players